Marisha Ray Huber (born May 10, 1989) is an American voice actress, host, producer, and creative director. She is best known for her roles as herself and her characters Keyleth, Beauregard, and Laudna on the Dungeons & Dragons web series Critical Role. In video games, she most notably voiced Margaret in Persona 4 Arena Ultimax and Persona Q, Laura S. Arseid in The Legend of Heroes: Trails of Cold Steel series, and Miranda in Metal Gear: Survive.

Early life 
Marisha Ray Huber was born in Mount Washington, Kentucky, the daughter of a mother who works as a dog groomer and a father who sells truck tires. She hails from an extended family of Louisville farmers, having helped her grandfather with chores around his tobacco farm as she was growing up from when she was around six years old. At the age of 12, she began acting at the Actors Theater of Louisville. In 2008, at the age of 19, she moved to Los Angeles to pursue a career in entertainment. Her parents supported the decision and drove her there. She arrived around the time of the Writers Guild strike and so, having difficulty in finding auditions, she began canvassing for the 2008 presidential election to support herself financially. As the election came to a close, she took up street performing on Hollywood Boulevard by tap-dancing for a short time, before eventually moving on to full-time busking by dressing up as Tinkerbell for three years.

Career

Web series 
Ray produced a Batgirl fan series in 2012 called Batgirl: Spoiled, in which she played the titular character. In 2015, she began co-starring in the web series Critical Role, on which she joins fellow voice actors in playing Dungeons & Dragons Fifth Edition. Her character for the first campaign was Keyleth, a half-elf druid. Her character for the second campaign was Beauregard, a human monk.

She was involved in many of Geek & Sundry's other productions, including co-hosting Key Questions, acting in Sagas of Sundry, and producing Signal Boost! She announced her appointment to the post of creative director for Geek & Sundry on July 28, 2017, however, she stepped down from the position in June 2018.

Critical Role Productions 
After becoming hugely successful, the Critical Role cast left the Geek & Sundry network in early 2019 and set up their own production company, Critical Role Productions; Ray became the creative director for the company. In February 2019, Critical Role began to air on its own channel and was no longer broadcast by Geek & Sundry. Soon after, Critical Role Productions aimed to raise $750,000 on Kickstarter to create an animated series of their first campaign, but ended up raising over $11 million. In November 2019, Amazon Prime Video announced that they had acquired the streaming rights to this animated series, now titled The Legend of Vox Machina; Ray reprised her role as Keyleth. Ahead of the series premiere in January 2022, Amazon renewed the series for a second season which premiered in January 2023. On October 6, 2022, Amazon renewed the series for a third season. Madison Durham, for Polygon in February 2022, commented that "Ray has been instrumental in making Critical Role into the sprawling multimedia company that it is today, contributing as the creative lead for shows like All Work No Play, Exandria Unlimited, and more. In interviews and media appearances, the persona she presents behind the scenes is distinctly different from Keyleth's brand of awkward deference. Ray appears to command the room, regularly making difficult decisions that impact the entire organization".

Critical Role was both the Webby Winner and the People's Voice Winner in the "Games (Video Series & Channels)" category at the 2019 Webby Awards; the show was also both a Finalist and the Audience Honor Winner at the 2019 Shorty Awards. Since the premiere of Critical Role's third campaign in October 2021, Ray has played as the multiclassed warlock/sorcerer Laudna.

A Familiar Problem, a one-page RPG co-written by Ray and Grant Howitt, was released in June 2022; it was published by the Critical Role Productions imprint Darrington Press. Also in June 2022, Critical Role Productions launched a new record label, Scanlan Shorthalt Music, to release original music inspired by Critical Role and the Exandria setting. Along with the label announcement, they released their first album titled Welcome to Tal'Dorei. The new project is led by Ray and Senior Producer Maxwell James. In November 2022, the label released a second album titled Welcome to Wildemount.

Personal life 
Ray married fellow voice actor and Critical Role co-star Matthew Mercer on October 21, 2017.

In January 2023, Ray was announced as part of the Creator Clash 2 charity boxing card, scheduled for April 15, 2023.

Filmography

Voice-over filmography

Live-action filmography

Notes

References

External links 

 

Living people
American video game actresses
American voice actresses
21st-century American actresses
20th-century American actresses
People from Los Angeles
Actresses from Los Angeles
Web series producers
American web series actresses
1989 births